Dubautia latifolia is a rare species of flowering plant in the family Asteraceae known by the common name koholapehu. It is endemic to Hawaii where it is known only from the west side of the island of Kauai.   Like other Dubautia this plant is called na`ena`e.

Distribution
Dubautia latifolia, a member of the silversword alliance, grows in scattered locations in the moist and wet forests near Waimea Canyon on Kauai. The habitat receives up to 190 centimeters of precipitation annually. The forest is dominated by koa (Acacia koa), ohia (Metrosideros polymorpha) and uluhe (Dicranopteris linearis).

There are no more than 200 individuals remaining. There are about 18 occurrences, but most of these are made up of only one or two plants.

Description
Dubautia latifolia is a liana which can exceed  in length. It climbs trees, reaching several meters up into the canopy. Blooming occurs in September through November, when the plant produces panicles of yellow flowers.

Conservation
Dubautia latifolia was federally listed as an endangered species of the United States in 1992.

Threats to this species and its habitat include feral pigs, feral goats, rats, and deer. Invasive plant species that threaten it include Santa Barbara daisy (Erigeron karvinskianus), kahili ginger (Hedychium spp.), lantana (Lantana camara), airplant (Kalanchoe pinnata) and firetree (Myrica faya). Conservation efforts include the collection of seeds and the planting of young plants in appropriate habitat.

References

External links
USDA Plants Profile for Dubautia latifolia

latifolia
Endemic flora of Hawaii
Biota of Kauai